Wolfstein was a minor principality in the Holy Roman Empire, centered on Wolfstein castle, near Neumarkt in der Oberpfalz.

External links
"Die Geschichte der Burg Wolfstein" (The History of Wolfstein Castle) at Burgruine Wolfstein. Retrieved 10 July 2012. 

States and territories established in 1217
1383 disestablishments
Principalities of the Holy Roman Empire